Boophis andrangoloaka is a species of frog in the family Mantellidae. It is endemic to Madagascar.

References

andrangoloaka
Endemic amphibians of Madagascar
Amphibians described in 1928